Jan Henrik Stahlberg (born 30 December 1970) is a German actor and film director. He appeared in more than sixty films since 2000.

Selected filmography

References

External links 

1970 births
Living people
German male film actors